Switzerland's Next Topmodel season 3 is the third season of Switzerland's Next Topmodel (often abbreviated to SNTM). It aired on ProSieben Schweiz from September 2021. Like last season, the show introduces  male models into the competition. The show is hosted by Topmodel Manuela Frey. The international destination is Naxos, Greece.

The winner will receive a modeling contract with Scout Model Agency, a cover and spread in Annabelle Magazine and a Opel Mokka-e.

Contestants
(ages stated are at start of contest)

Episode summaries

Episode 1 
Original airdate: 

The first episode of Switzerland's Next Topmodel was the casting episode.

From thousands of applicants, 18 boys and girls were flown to Naxos, Greece. They are welcomed into the competition by  Swiss top model, Manuela Frey. Model and runway coach, Papis Loveday and  winner of the first season of  Austria's Next Topmodel, Larissa Marolt.
The aspiring models to be began with their promo shoot. Based on that outcome two models were not chosen by Papis nor Larissa to be in their team.

Eliminated outside judging panel: Kristina Lazić & Rhea Manz

After choosing the final teams the remaining contestants had to walk the runway. At panel two more models are eliminated, leaving fourteen to move on in the competition.

First Eliminated: Sophia Plüss
Bottom Two: André Marques & Leonardo da Silva
Eliminated: Leonardo da Silva

Episode 2
Original airdate: 

The models work in pairs for this week photoshoot. At panel Carlos is eliminated.

Immune: Team Larissa
Bottom Two: Carlos Pinheiro & Jeremy Baumann
Eliminated: Carlos Pinheiro

Episode 3
Original airdate: 

This week the contestants underwent their makeovers and shot their sed cards.
At panel Raphael was eliminated. 

Bottom two: André Marques & Raphael Gurschler
Eliminated: Raphael Gurschler

Episode 4
Original airdate: 

Quit: Aleksandra Popovic
Booked for job: Aldin Zahirovic & Venance Amvame
Bottom two: André Marques & Lea von Lombardini
Eliminated: André Marques & Lea von Lombardini

Episode 5
Original airdate: 

Booked for job: Luca Meier & Venance Amvame
Bottom two: Ludwig Heskamp & Nadia Mascaro
Eliminated: Ludwig Heskamp

Episode 6
Original airdate: 

Bottom two: Nadia Mascaro & Stella Kızıldağ
Eliminated: Nadia Mascaro

Episode 7
Original airdate: 

Booked for job: Dennis De Vree & Venance Amvame
Bottom four: Jeremy Baumann, Lara Eggert, Luca Meier & Stella Kızıldağ 
Eliminated: Jeremy Baumann & Stella Kızıldağ

Episode 8
Original airdate: 

Quit: Lara Eggert
Eliminated: Luca Meier

Episode 9
Original airdate: 

Top three: Aldin Zahirovic, Dennis De Vree & Venance Amvame
Eliminated: Aldin Zahirovic
Top two: Dennis De Vree & Venance Amvame
Switzerland's Next Topmodel: Dennis De Vree

Summaries 

 The contestant was immune from elimination
 The contestant was in danger of elimination
 The contestant quit the competition
 The contestant was eliminated outside of the judging panel
 The contestant was eliminated
 The contestant won the competition

Photo shoots 
Episode 1 photo shoot: Promo shoot (semifinals)
Episode 2 photo shoot: Mystic Waters in Pairs
Episode 3 photo shoot: Sedcard
Episode 5 photo shoot: Nude with snake
Episode 6 photo shoot: Posing in the height
Episode 7 photo shoot: Ice & Glamour
Episode 8 photo shoot: Annabelle magazine cover

References

Top Model